is a Japanese former water polo player who competed in the 1984 Summer Olympics.

See also
 Japan men's Olympic water polo team records and statistics
 List of men's Olympic water polo tournament goalkeepers

References

External links
 

1961 births
Living people
Japanese male water polo players
Water polo goalkeepers
Olympic water polo players of Japan
Water polo players at the 1984 Summer Olympics
Asian Games medalists in water polo
Water polo players at the 1982 Asian Games
Asian Games silver medalists for Japan
Medalists at the 1982 Asian Games